Mims Spur is a prominent rock spur protruding from the southern extremity of Wisconsin Plateau, Antarctica, situated just southeast of Polygon Spur on the north side of McCarthy Glacier. It was mapped by the United States Geological Survey from surveys and U.S. Navy air photos, 1960–64, and was named by the Advisory Committee on Antarctic Names for Julius E. Mims, Jr., a radio operator at Byrd Station in 1962.

References

Ridges of Marie Byrd Land